Christopher Michael Hardwick (born December 6, 1983) is an American competitive speedcuber.

Born in Merritt Island, Florida, he attended the North Carolina School of Science and Mathematics (class of 2002) and University of North Carolina at Chapel Hill (class of 2005).

He is known especially for his blindfolded world record solution times of Rubik's Revenge and Rubik's Professor's Cube puzzles, though he started out as a top one-handed cuber. Chris holds the former world record for the blindfolded solve time of the Rubik's Professor's Cube with 15 minutes 22 seconds.

Hardwick has made a number of television appearances demonstrating the Rubik's Cube, including MTV in 2002, Canada AM and Much Music in the fall of 2003, discussing the 2003 Rubik's Cube World Championships.  His home videos have also appeared on numerous online video sites including CollegeHumor and Digg.  A home video of Hardwick solving a 3x3x3 Rubik's Cube one-handed appeared on VH1 in 2006 for Web Junk 20.  Axe deodorant parodied another one of Hardwick's home videos in their 2006 South African "Get a Girlfriend" commercial campaign.

Chris Hardwick, the comedian, referenced this particular Chris Hardwick on Web Soup in 2009 when a comment about the Rubik's Cube was made.  The two met during the comedian's show at the Barrymore Theatre in Madison, Wisconsin, on April 11, 2015.

References

External links
Chris Hardwick's listing at the World Cube Association
Chris Hardwick's webpage

American speedcubers
Living people
1983 births
People from Merritt Island, Florida